Nightfly may refer to:

The Nightfly, the first solo album by Steely Dan co-founder Donald Fagen
Nightfly (band), a short-lived British rock band

See also 
Night Flight (disambiguation)
Night Flyer (disambiguation)
Night flying restrictions